This is a list of films produced by Maldivian film industry ordered by year and decade of release.

2020s
List of Maldivian films of 2023
List of Maldivian films of 2022
List of Maldivian films of 2021
List of Maldivian films of 2020

2010s
List of Maldivian films of 2019
List of Maldivian films of 2018
List of Maldivian films of 2017
List of Maldivian films of 2016
List of Maldivian films of 2015
List of Maldivian films of 2014
List of Maldivian films of 2013
List of Maldivian films of 2012
List of Maldivian films of 2011
List of Maldivian films of 2010

2000s
List of Maldivian films of 2009
List of Maldivian films of 2008
List of Maldivian films of 2007
List of Maldivian films of 2006
List of Maldivian films of 2005
List of Maldivian films of 2004
List of Maldivian films of 2003
List of Maldivian films of 2002
List of Maldivian films of 2001
List of Maldivian films of 2000

1990s
List of Maldivian films of 1999
List of Maldivian films of 1998
List of Maldivian films of 1997
List of Maldivian films of 1996
List of Maldivian films of 1995
List of Maldivian films of 1994
List of Maldivian films of 1993
List of Maldivian films of 1992

1980s

References